Ushkovo may refer to:

Ushkovo, Saint Petersburg, a municipal settlement under jurisdiction of the city of St. Petersburg, Russia
Ushkovo, Republic of Karelia, a village in the Republic of Karelia, Russia